Theatre de Marionnettes is the fourth studio album by the band CAB, released on October 20, 2009 through Brunel Music. It marked the replacement of drummer Dennis Chambers, who performed on all previous CAB albums, with Virgil Donati.

Track listing

Personnel
Tony MacAlpine – guitar, keyboard (tracks 4, 5, 7, 8), mixing, production
Freddie Fox – guitar (tracks 1, 6, 10)
Bernard Torelli – guitar (track 12), mixing, mastering
Patrice Rushen – clavinet, keyboard (track 10), piano (tracks 11, 13)
Bunny Brunel – keyboard (tracks 6, 9, 12), bass, mixing, production
Sandeep Chowta – keyboard (tracks 1, 3)
Chick Corea – electric piano
Michel Polnareff – piano (track 6)
Brian Auger – Hammond organ
Virgil Donati – drums
Jeff Elliott – trumpet
Doug Webb – saxophone
Tyrone Fernandes – mastering

References

CAB (band) albums
2009 albums